Henry Agar-Ellis, 3rd Viscount Clifden (25 February 1825 – 20 February 1866), styled the Lord Dover from 1833 to 1836, was an Irish courtier and racehorse owner.

Viscount Clifden was the eldest son of George Agar-Ellis, 1st Baron Dover, and his wife Lady Georgiana, daughter of George Howard, 6th Earl of Carlisle. He succeeded as Baron Dover on the death of his father in 1833 and in the viscountcy of Clifden on the death of his grandfather in 1836. He was educated at Eton and Christ Church, Oxford, and served as a Gentleman of the Bedchamber to the Prince Consort from 1846 to 1852. He owned the successful racehorses, Crucifix and her son, Surplice.

Lord Clifden married Eliza Horatia Frederica, daughter of Frederick Charles William Seymour, in 1861. He died in February 1866, aged 40, and was succeeded in his titles by his only son Henry. Lady Clifden was later a Lady of the Bedchamber from 1867 to 1872 and was appointed a Lady of the Royal Order of Victoria and Albert (3rd Class). In 1870 she married Sir Walter George Stirling of Faskine, 3rd Baronet. She died in April 1896, aged 62.

References 
 Descendants of William the Conqueror
 Bulletins from the London Gazette August 10, 1846
Surplice's bloodlines

Notes 

Alumni of Christ Church, Oxford
People educated at Eton College
Owners of Epsom Derby winners
Viscounts in the Peerage of Ireland
Eldest sons of British hereditary barons
1825 births
1866 deaths